Bini is a surname. Notable people with the surname include:

Aldo Bini (1915–1993), Italian road bicycle racer
Alfredo Bini (1926–2010), Italian film producer
Bino Bini (1900-1974), Italian fencer
Bruno Bini (born 1954), former French footballer and manager of the French women's national team
Armando Bini (1887-1950), Italian tenor
Dario Andrea Bini, Italian mathematician 
Francesco Bini (born 1989), Italian football defender
Giacomo Bini (1938–2014), Franciscan priest
Graziano Bini (born 1955), retired Italian professional football defender and manager
Henri Bini (born 1931), Monegasque fencer
Joe Bini (born 1963), Werner Herzog's film editor
Lorenzo Bini Smaghi (born 1956), Italian economist
Lucio Bini (1908–1964), Italian psychiatrist
Ola Bini (born 1982), Swedish programmer and Internet activist
Pasquale Bini (1716–1770), Italian violinist
Pierluigi Bini, Roman rock-climber
Pierre Bini (1923-1991), French footballer 
Sebastián Bini (born 1979), Argentinean footballer

Italian-language surnames